Joseph Bertram Ford (7 May 1886 – after 1914) was an English footballer. His regular position was as a forward. He was born in Northwich, Cheshire. He played for Witton Albion, Crewe Alexandra, Manchester United, Nottingham Forest and Goole Town.

External links
MUFCInfo.com profile

1886 births
Sportspeople from Northwich
Year of death missing
Association football outside forwards
English footballers
Witton Albion F.C. players
Crewe Alexandra F.C. players
Manchester United F.C. players
Nottingham Forest F.C. players
Goole Town F.C. players
English Football League players